"Let the Beat Control Your Body" is a song by Belgian/Dutch Eurodance band 2 Unlimited. It is the fifth and final single released from their second album, No Limits (1993). The album version is largely instrumental and contains just a few spoken words from Ray Slijngaard and Anita Doth. The single version contains full verses rapped by Slijngaard and a new chorus sung by Doth, which were co-written by them both. The song charted in many European countries, peaking at number two in the Netherlands and within the top 10 in Belgium, Finland, France, Germany, Ireland, Spain and the United Kingdom. It was nominated in the category for Best Song on MTV Awards. Nigel Simpkiss directed the music video for "Let the Beat Control Your Body".

Reception and airplay
James Hamilton from Music Weeks RM Dance Update described the song as a "techno-pop galloper". Scottish newspaper Perthshire Advertiser stated, "You know what to expect and, yes, they deliver it!" Mark Frith from Smash Hits declared it as "buzzy" in his review of the No Limits album, complimenting it as a song "that stands out individually." Another editor, Tony Cross, gave it two out of five, saying, "It's still techno, techno, techno with a dash of techno for good measure."

"Let The Beat Control Your Body" entered the European airplay chart Border Breakers at number 16 on 4 February due to crossover airplay in Central-, North West- and North-Europe and peaked at number four on 19 March.

Chart performance
"Let the Beat Control Your Body" was a sizeable hit all over Europe, peaking within the top 10 in Belgium, Finland, Germany, Ireland, the Netherlands (number two), Scotland, Spain and the United Kingdom. In the latter, the single peaked at number six on 27 February 1994, its third week on the UK Singles Chart. It also charted on the UK Dance Singles Chart, peaking at number 14. On the Eurochart Hot 100, "Let the Beat Control Your Body" made it to number five, entering the chart on 12 February at 87 and soaring up to peak at five within three weeks. It also reached number-one on the European Dance Radio Chart and number three on MTV's European Top 20. Additionally, the song was a top 20 hit in Austria, Denmark, Sweden and Switzerland. Outside Europe, it peaked at number six in Israel, number 29 in New Zealand and number 39 in Australia.

Music video
The accompanying music video for "Let The Beat Control Your Body" was directed by Nigel Simpkiss and released in the UK in January 1994. It received heavy rotation on MTV Europe and was A-listed on Germany's VIVA. The video was later published on 2 Unlimited's official YouTube channel in December 2013, and as of December 2022, it had generated more than 4,1 million views. Simpkiss would also be directing the video for the duo's next single, "The Real Thing".

Appearances
Dance music artist Chaah (aka Susanne Jark) uses the melody from "Let the Beat Control Your Body" in her 1999 release titled "The Funkiness of You".

It also became famous again because of Britain's Got Talent when act DJ John performed the song in the auditions.

Track listings

 7-inch single "Let the Beat Control Your Body" (airplay edit)
 "Get Ready for No Limits" (Part 2)

 Belgian 12-inch maxi "Let the Beat Control Your Body" (X-Out in Trance) (5:11)
 "Let the Beat Control Your Body" (extended) (5:58)
 "Let the Beat Control Your Body" (extended) (5:58)
 "Get Ready for No Limits" (Murphy's Megamix Part 2) (6:45)

 Germany 12-inch maxi "Let the Beat Control Your Body" (X-Out in Trance remix) (5:11)
 "Let the Beat Control Your Body" (extended) (5:58)
 "Let the Beat Control Your Body" (X-Out in Rio) (5:06)
 "Get Ready for No Limits" (Murphy's Megamix Part 2) (6:45)

 UK CD single "Let the Beat Control Your Body" (airplay edit) (3:38)
 "Let the Beat Control Your Body" (X-Out in Rio) (5:06)
 "Murphy's Megamix Part 1"
 "Get Ready for no Limits" (Murphy's Megamix Part 2) (6:45)

 Australian CD maxi "Let the Beat Control Your Body" (airplay edit)
 "Let the Beat Control Your Body" (X-Out in Trance)
 "Let the Beat Control Your Body" (extended)
 "Let the Beat Control Your Body" (X-Out in Rio)
 "Murphy's Megamix Pt 2"

 Dutch CD maxi'
 "Let the Beat Control Your Body" (airplay edit) (3:38)
 "Let the Beat Control Your Body" (X-Out in Trance) (5:11)
 "Let the Beat Control Your Body" (extended) (5:58)
 "Let the Beat Control Your Body" (X-Out in Rio) (5:06)
 "Get Ready for no Limits" (Murphy's Megamix Part 2) (6:45)

Charts

Weekly charts

Year-end charts

Release history

References

1993 songs
1994 singles
2 Unlimited songs
Byte Records singles
English-language Dutch songs
Music videos directed by Nigel Simpkiss
Pete Waterman Entertainment singles
Songs written by Anita Doth
Songs written by Jean-Paul De Coster
Songs written by Phil Wilde
Songs written by Ray Slijngaard
ZYX Music singles